Rob Wilson (born 6 September 1952, in Auckland) is a former racing driver from New Zealand. Wilson raced in various formula racing and endurance racing series.

Career history

Formula racing
Rob Wilson won a scholarship to race in the 1975 British Formula Ford season. The following year he returned to New Zealand to race in the New Zealand Formula Ford Championship where he came in second in the championship. The Kiwi won a British Formula Ford 2000 race at Mallory Park in 1977, driving a Reynard.  When he entered the British Formula Three Championship he won the fifteenth race of the season at Mallory Park. Scoring another two podium finishes the Kiwi ended up sixth in the BARC championship. The following season Wilson raced with year old equipment and could only score four points. The young driver won the 1980 BARC TV Trophy, a non-championship race for Formula 3 cars. In the British championship he scored five podium finishes and secured the fifth place in the standings. In early 1981 the New Zealander returned to his home country. He raced a part-time schedule in the Formula Pacific series. His best result came at Manfield Autocourse, here he finished third out of ten drivers. After obtaining his FIA Super Licence the Kiwi tried his racing luck in Formula One. He was first approached by Fittipaldi Automotive to replace the retiring Emerson Fittipaldi. But after the Brazilian cruzeiro was devaluated he needed to bring a sponsor which he did not have. Before the 1981 Belgian Grand Prix Wilson got into contact with Ken Tyrrell. But as Michele Alboreto offered more sponsor money he got the seat for the remainder of the season.

After a failed try to get into Formula One he returned to the British Formula Three Championship. The 1984 British Formula Three season was no success. Wilson partnered with Eddie Jordan Racing but failed to score a single point. After some low seasons in the British championship Wilson moved to the United States.

When moving to the United States Rob Wilson started to race in the Barber Saab Pro Series. Wilson scored a fifth place in the 1988 season. During the season the New Zealander won two races, at Road America and in the streets of Tamiami Park. The 1989 Barber Saab Pro Series season had more success, the driver won three races. While Robbie Buhl dominated the season Wilson achieved the runner up position in the championship beating Justin Bell. Wilsons big break through came in 1990. The driver won six out of the twelve rounds of the series and won the championship by 55 points. With eleven wins Rob Wilson is the winningest driver in the 18 years of the Barber Pro Series.

After winning the championship Rob Wilson started in the Indy Lights in 1991. His best result came at Mid-Ohio Sports Car Course while driving for Stuart Moore Racing. Wilson finished ninth in his March Wildcat. Wilson returned in Indy Lights in 1994. While driving for Team Leisy the New Zealander achieved his best result in Indy Lights. At the Milwaukee Mile he finished fifth.  Wilson scored 22 points and finished twelfth in the standings. With these results Wilson was the best classified part-time driver even beating some full-time Indy Lights competitors. With the creation of the IndyCar Series Wilson entered the 1996 Indy 500 with Project Indy. The racer was entered in a Ford Cosworth XB powered Lola T93/00 sponsored by gun manufacturer Ruger. Racing in 1993 built equipment Wilson failed to qualify. He was the third fastest non qualifier of a total of ten non qualifiers.

NASCAR
Rob Wilson made his stockcar racing debut in the 1994 GMC Trucks 200K, a NASCAR Busch North Series race at Lime Rock Park. The 41-year-old started 24th but had to retire after a transmission failure.  He returned to the series the following year. His best result came at Nazareth Speedway. While racing a Pontiac owned by Joe Bessey he finished fifteenth. Wilson achieved the height of is Busch North career in 1996. Wilson led a lap at the 1996 Burnham Boilers 150 at Watkins Glen International, he eventually finished sixth.

In 1995 the Kiwi made his debut in the NASCAR Busch Grand National Series. He was first entered in the 1995 NE Chevy Dealers 250 at New Hampshire International Speedway but failed to qualify. He qualified 42nd (as last starter) the following race at Nazareth. Racing in the #9 Delco Remy Pontiac he raced his way through the field finishing fifteenth. The New Zealander returned for two races in 1997. He failed to finish both races due to mechanical breakdown.

Sportscar racing
Wilson raced a few races in the IMSA Camel Lights. Wilson and his teammate Ken Knott finished seventh in class in the 1990 Grand Prix of Miami. Rob Wilson drove his first 12 Hours of Sebring in 1991. After 140 laps the Mazda MX-6 had an accident which took it out of the race.  The Kiwi also raced full-time in the IMSA Supercar Championship. While driving a Consulier GTP his best finish was a fourth place at Road America. Rob Wilson, with teammates Honorato Espinosa, Felipe Solano and Pete Uria, raced in the 1991 24 Hours of Daytona. The team raced in the GTU class and finished fifteenth overall, second in class. In the 1992 running of the race the car suffered a fire and was classified 21st overall, seventh in class. While racing a Nissan 240SX in the 1995 24 Hours of Daytona the racing team finished sixth overall, second in class. In 1999 the New Zealander entered two FIA GT rounds. Partnered with Robert Nearn, Wilson was entered by Seikel Motorsport in the Donington 500km. After 45 laps the Porsche 911 GT2 suffered gearbox problems and had to retire. Rob Wilson competed in the first ever Rolex Sports Car Series, the 2000 24 Hours of Daytona with Martin Henderson. The Pillbeam MP84 suffered gearbox problems after 2 hours and 30 minutes of racing and had to retire. The MP84 was the only car in the SR2 class. The low car count was not surprising, the SR2 cars were not designed for 24 hours of racing. The following season Wilson raced in the British GT Championship for Hayles Racing in a Chrysler Viper. The Kiwi won the races at Snetterton, Oulton Park, Knockhill and Brands Hatch. Furthermore, he scored another seven podium finishes.  These good results put him in the third place of the championship. In 2004 the New Zealander competed in all the major endurance races. After finishing 18th at Daytona and 28th at Sebring the European season began. His best result in the Le Mans Series came at the 2004 1000 km of Monza where he finished 17th. At Le Mans the team finished 19th overall, seventh in class. Wilson ended the season at Petit Le Mans where he failed to finish. Wilson continued to race with Cirtek Motorsport in 2005. In 2006 and 2007 the New Zealander raced in various GT races. Wilson competed in the 2007 24 Hours of Daytona racing an Infiniti G35. The team had to retire eight hours into the race. The Kiwi also continued to race in Britcar and British GT scoring various top ten finishes in a works Marcos Mantis. With Red Bull Racing designer Adrian Newey as one of his teammates, Wilson achieved a class victory in the 2008 Dubai 24 Hour.

Outside racing
Besides racing itself he was a racing instructor at the Skip Barber Racing School. Rob Wilson is a driver coach for many aspiring drivers. Juan Pablo Montoya, Kimi Räikkönen, David Coulthard, Marco Andretti, Lance Stroll, Valtteri Bottas, Nikita Mazepin, Giorgio Vinella and Valentino Rossi are among the drivers Wilson has trained over the years. He was also one of the key people involved in the Grand Prix Shootout out of which Tio Ellinas came forth. Most of his driving coaching takes place at Bruntingthorpe Proving Ground.

Rob Wilson is also an avid musician. The Kiwi played bass guitar during his time with 1970's pop band Edison Lighthouse. He played bass guitar on the band's number one record "Love Grows (Where My Rosemary Goes)". The song was number one for five weeks in the UK Singles Chart. Wilson is currently part of country/rock/blues formation Grand Prairie.

Racing record

American open–wheel racing results
(key)

Indy Lights

IndyCar

NASCAR
(key) (Bold – Pole position awarded by qualifying time. Italics – Pole position earned by points standings or practice time. * – Most laps led.)

Busch Series

Busch North Series

Complete 24 Hours of Le Mans results

Complete 12 Hours of Sebring results

References

New Zealand racing drivers
Indianapolis 500 drivers
24 Hours of Le Mans drivers
24 Hours of Daytona drivers
12 Hours of Sebring drivers
NASCAR drivers
Rolex Sports Car Series drivers
American Le Mans Series drivers
British GT Championship drivers
European Le Mans Series drivers
FIA GT Championship drivers
IMSA GT Championship drivers
New Zealand bass guitarists
Male bass guitarists
1952 births
People from Auckland
Living people
Barber Pro Series drivers
New Zealand male guitarists
New Zealand guitarists